Microgecko is a genus of geckos, lizards in the family Gekkonidae. The genus is endemic to Asia.

Species
The genus Microgecko comprises 8 species which are recognized as being valid.
Microgecko chabaharensis  — Chabahar dwarf gecko 
Microgecko depressus  — low-lying gecko
Microgecko helenae  — Khuzestan dwarf gecko, banded dwarf Gecko, Helen's banded dwarf gecko
Microgecko laki  — Laki dwarf gecko
Microgecko latifi  — Latifi's dwarf gecko
Microgecko persicus  – Persian dwarf gecko, Persian sand gecko
Microgecko tanishpaensis  – Tanishpa's dwarf gecko
Microgecko varaviensis  
 
Nota bene: A binomial authority in parentheses indicates that the species was originally described in a genus other than Microgecko.

References

Further reading
"Nikolski AM" (1907) ("1905"). "Reptiles et Amphibies, recueillis par Mr. N. A. Zaroudny en Perse en 1903–1904 ". Annuaire du Musée Zoologique de l'Académie Impériale des Sciences de St.-Pétersbourg 10 (3-4): 260-301 + Plate I. (Microgecko, new genus, pp. 264–265). (article in Latin and Russian, article title in French in table of contents of journal).

 
Lizard genera
Taxa named by Alexander Nikolsky